Classeya bicuspidalis is a moth in the family Crambidae. It was described by George Hampson in 1919. It is found in the Democratic Republic of the Congo, Malawi, Mozambique and Zimbabwe.

References

Crambinae
Moths described in 1919
Moths of Sub-Saharan Africa